is a stony, sub-kilometer asteroid and likely the slowest rotator known to exist. It is classified as near-Earth object of the Amor group and measures approximately 800 meters in diameter. The asteroid was discovered on 10 January 1997 by the Spacewatch survey at Kitt Peak National Observatory near Tucson, Arizona

Orbit and classification 

 is an Amor asteroid, a group of near-Earth object that approach the orbit of Earth from beyond, but do not cross it. It orbits the Sun at a distance of 1.1–3.7 AU once every 3 years and 8 months (1,330 days). Its orbit has an eccentricity of 0.55 and an inclination of 5° with respect to the ecliptic.

Published by the Digitized Sky Survey, a first precovery was taken at the Australian Siding Spring Observatory in July 1992, extending the body's observation arc by more than 4 years prior to its official discovery observation at Kitt Peak.

Close approaches 

 occasionally makes close approaches to Earth and Mars.

Its closest recorded approach to Earth took place on 30 August 2003, when the asteroid came within  from Earth. It will come closer still on 8 October 2145, when it will be within  from Earth. The asteroid will make its closest approach to Mars on 29 December 2054 when it will come within  from the planet.

Physical properties

Spectral type 

 is a rare Q-type asteroid with a very dark surface, reflecting only about 7% of the light it receives. It has also been described a common stony S-type asteroid.

Slow rotator 

It holds the record for being the slowest-rotating asteroid discovered so far. Its precise period with a smaller error margin still needs to be determined. The lightcurve also showed a high brightness variation of at least 0.6 magnitude, which is indicative for a non-spherical shape. The asteroid may also be in a tumbling motion, but observations are not sufficient to determine any non-principal axis rotation.

Like other slowly-rotating asteroids such as 912 Maritima, it is possible that the extremely long period of this asteroid is caused by YORP radiation pressure slowing down the asteroid's rotation. This is especially likely considering that  has a very low albedo, which would allow it to absorb more radiant energy from the Sun. Furthermore, the YORP effect has also been observed on other Q-type asteroids such as 1862 Apollo.

Diameter and albedo 

According to the survey carried out by the NEOWISE mission of NASA's Wide-field Infrared Survey Explorer,  measures 0.847 kilometers in diameter and its surface has an albedo of 0.186. The Collaborative Asteroid Lightcurve Link assumes a standard albedo for stony asteroids of 0.20 and calculates a diameter of 0.782 kilometers based on an absolute magnitude of 17.9.

Naming 

As of 2017, this asteroid remains unnamed.

Notes

References

External links 
 Asteroid Lightcurve Database (LCDB), query form (info )
 Dictionary of Minor Planet Names, Google books
 Asteroids and comets rotation curves, CdR Observatoire de Genève, Raoul Behrend
 
 
 

162058
162058
162058
19970110